The 2015–16 Long Beach State 49ers men's basketball team represented California State University, Long Beach during the 2015–16 NCAA Division I men's basketball season. The 49ers were led by ninth year head coach Dan Monson and played their home games at Walter Pyramid. They were members of the Big West Conference. They finished the season 20–15, 12–4 in Big West play to finish in third place. They defeated UC Riverside and UC Irvine to advance to the championship game of the Big West tournament where they lost to Hawaii. They were invited to the National Invitation Tournament where they lost in the first round to Washington.

Previous season 
The 49ers finished the 2014–15 season with a record of 16–17, 10–6 in conference and finishing in fourth place. They lost in the first round of the Big West tournament to Hawaii.

Roster

Schedule

|-
!colspan=9 style="background:#000000; color:#FFDF00;"| Non-conference regular season

|-
!colspan=9 style="background:#000000; color:#FFDF00;"| Big West regular season

|-
!colspan=9 style="background:#000000; color:#FFDF00;"| Big West tournament

|-
!colspan=9 style="background:#000000; color:#FFDF00;"| NIT

References

Long Beach State Beach men's basketball seasons
Long Beach State
Long Beach State
Long Beach State 49ers men's basketball
Long Beach State 49ers men's basketball